The Real Compañía Ópera de Cámara de Barcelona orchestra (RCOC) (English "Royal Chamber Opera Company from Barcelona", Catalan "Reial Companyía Òpera de Cambra de Barcelona") is a Spanish early music ensemble based in Barcelona. It was founded by its conductor Juan Bautista Otero. The orchestra has been instrumental in reviving several long unperformed Baroque operas.

Discography
 Domènec Terradellas Sesostri. Sunhae Im, Alexandrina Pendatchanska, Kenneth Tarver, Ditte Andersen, Rafaella Milanesi, Tom Randle. RCOC 3 CDs.
 Vicente Martín y Soler. Ifigenia in Aulide. K617 2 CDs
 Soler. 2 cantatas. La dora festeggiante, Il sogno. (70 minutes) RCOC 2 CDs
 Terradellas. Artaserse. Venice, 1744. Opera seria in 3 acts. Anna Maria Panzarella, Celine Ricci, Marina Comparato, RCOC 3 CDs
 Antonio Maria Mazzoni. Aminta, il re pastore. K617 2 CDs
 Nicola Porpora. Orlando.  K617 2 CDs

Forthcoming
 Mazzoni. Antigono (Lisbon 1755). CD & DVD  Otero RCOC
 Davide Pérez Solimano (Lisbon 1757 & Cádiz 1768). Otero RCOC
 Porpora. Gli Orti Esperidi (Naples 1721). Otero RCOC

References

External links
 Royal Chamber Opera Company from Barcelona
 Real Compañía Ópera de Cámara de Barcelona (Spanish)
 Reial Companyía Òpera de Cambra de Barcelona (Catalan)
 Otero biography on website

Spanish orchestras
Early music groups